Jessica Aguirre is a Cuban-American television journalist.

Biography
Jessica Aguirre is a first generation Cuban-American, the daughter of immigrants. She grew up in Florida.

Aguirre began her broadcasting career while a student at the University of Miami. While living in Florida, she was hired as a general assignment reporter for Fox affiliate WSVN. She was promoted to co-anchor for the station's 10:00 pm newscast, which also featured a young Jillian Warry reporting the weather.

Aguirre then made her way to Los Angeles, California, where she worked at ABC owned-and-operated station KABC-TV as a reporter and anchor. After her work in Los Angeles, in the mid-1990s, Aguirre came to the San Francisco Bay Area where she was hired by KGO-TV Channel 7.

After leaving her KGO position, Aguirre was hired as an anchor for NBC-owned-and-operated station KNTV Channel 11. She currently anchors the station's 6:00 pm and 11:00 pm newscasts, as well as hosting the Emmy-nominated NBC Class Action.

Aguirre is a member of the National Academy of Television Arts and Sciences.

Reportage
Aguirre has reported from Cuba, and has covered Hurricane Andrew and the Oklahoma City bombing. She has covered race riots in Miami, and prison riots in Atlanta and Louisiana. She has reported from GITMO, the prison at Guantanamo Bay and from London, England on Princess Diana.

Awards
Aguirre has won Emmy awards for her reporting on migrant workers and child molestation, while working in Los Angeles and Miami.

Charity work
Aguirre supports the League of United Latin American Citizens, the Mexican American Legal Defense and Educational Fund, the  Raphael House shelter, and El Hogar De Los Ninos, a Bay Area non-profit which provides education for children in Nicaragua.

Personal life
Aguirre is fluent in Spanish. She lives with her husband and two daughters.

References

External links
NBC Class Action website
Bilingual Reporters not worth so much
NBC Bay Area On-Air Talent Bio >> Jessica Aguirre

Television anchors from San Francisco
1963 births
Living people
Television anchors from Los Angeles
Television anchors from Miami
University of Miami alumni
People from Pleasanton, California
People from Aventura, Florida
Emmy Award winners